FamousNiki, real name Tamerlan Dzhidzhoev (Russian: Тамерлан Джиджоев), blogger, blogging on behalf of the cat FamousNiki, is a male Scottish Fold cat and an international celebrity on Instagram. FamousNiki became popular over the Internet (particularly in its native country, Russia) for his human-like behaviour, facial expressions and wide variety of unusual poses. Facebook verified and assigned Niki's profile a blue celebrity checkmark. Yandex Zen (Russian: Я́ндекс.Дзен) verified and assigned Niki's profile a blue celebrity checkmark.

Owner 

Nicky's owners are Victoria Virta] and her husband Tamerlan Dzhidzhoev. Victoria is a popular Russian media personality, entrepreneur and Internet marketer.

Popularity 
FamousNiki became popular on the internet due to its ability to sit upright on its hind legs. According to Virta, FamousNiki possessed this ability even in his early years and his posture is not due to any deformity.  She is cited as saying, "It’s just the way he feels comfortable." Another FamousNiki trademark is his ability to imitate a human by walking on just his hind legs.

In two years, FamousNiki gathered more than 127,000 followers on Instagram and more than 35,000 followers on Facebook. FamousNiki's Russian admirers created a fan community on social network VKontakte, which boasts more than 1,000 members. One of FamousNiki's photos is on “The 100 Most Important Cat Pictures of All Time Chart” according to BuzzFeed.

See also
 List of individual cats

References 

Internet memes about cats
Individual cats
2011 animal births